Cindy Williams Gutiérrez is an American poet and dramatist.

Early life and education 
Gutierrez was born and raised in Brownsville, Texas.

She earned an MFA from the University of Southern Maine Stonecoast Program.

Career 
In 2014, Poets & Writers named Gutiérrez a notable debut poet. In 2015, she was a finalist in the International Latino Book Awards. Gutiérrez received a 2016 Oregon Literary Fellowship.

Publications 
 the small claim of bones (Bilingual Press/Editorial Bilingüe, 2014)

References

External links 
 

People from Brownsville, Texas
University of Southern Maine alumni
American women poets
Poets from Texas
Year of birth missing (living people)
Living people
21st-century American women